DuPage High School District 88 (DuPage HSD 88) is a public high school district headquartered in Addison, Illinois. It serves portions of Addison, Villa Park, Oakbrook Terrace and Lombard. The district has two schools. As of 2018, it had 4,075 students.

Schools
Addison Trail High School
Willowbrook High School

References

School districts in DuPage County, Illinois
Addison, Illinois